Colonel Ulric Oliver Thynne CMG, DSO, CVO (6 July 1871 – 30 September 1957) was a distinguished British soldier and champion polo player.

Early life 

Thynne was born on 6 July 1871. He was the son of Rt. Hon. Lord Henry Frederick Thynne and Lady Ulrica Frederica Jane St. Maur Seymour. 
He was educated at Charterhouse School, Godalming, Surrey, England and at the Royal Military College, Sandhurst, Berkshire, England.

Career 
Thynne gained the rank of Lieutenant in the service of the King's Royal Rifle Corps, and fought in the Chitral Campaign in 1895. He was appointed a lieutenant in the Royal Wiltshire Yeomanry on 10 February 1900, and fought with the Imperial Yeomanry during the Second Boer War in South Africa, where he was mentioned in despatches, and for which he was appointed a Companion of the Distinguished Service Order (DSO) in November 1900. Following the war, he was promoted to Captain on 31 May 1902. He fought in the First World War, during which he was again mentioned in despatches and decorated with the award of Territorial Decoration (T.D.). He was invested as a Companion, Order of St. Michael and St. George (C.M.G.) in 1918. He was Colonel commanding the Royal Wiltshire Yeomanry. and became its Honorary Colonel in 1938. He was invested as a Commander, Royal Victorian Order (C.V.O.) in 1946.

A keen polo player, in 1903 he won the Roehampton Trophy.

Peerage claim 
In 1924, Thynne claimed the ancient Barony of Beauchamp from the House of Lords; the Committee for Privileges rejected the claim, holding that the evidence was insufficient to prove that the peerage was in fact created.

Family 

He married, firstly, Marjory Wormald, daughter of Edward Wormald, on 16 May 1899. The children of Colonel Ulric Oliver Thynne and Marjory Wormald are:
 Lt.-Col. Oliver St. Maur Thynne (24 October 1901 – 1 May 1978), who married Mary Wroughton Morris and had issue.
 Edward Wormald Thynne (17 Mar 1905 – 8 Oct 1925)
 G/Capt. Brian Sheridan Thynne (29 Nov 1907 – 1985), who married, firstly, Naomi Waters, married, secondly, Fernanda Herrero de Aledo, and had issue from both marriages.
 Ulrica Marjory Thynne (5 May 1911 – 22 Jan 1999)

He married, secondly, Elspeth Stiven Tullis, daughter of David Tullis, on 19 December 1951. He died on 30 September 1957 at age 86.

References 

English polo players
1871 births
1957 deaths
British military personnel of the Chitral Expedition
British Army personnel of the Second Boer War
Companions of the Order of St Michael and St George
Companions of the Distinguished Service Order
Commanders of the Royal Victorian Order
Graduates of the Royal Military College, Sandhurst
King's Royal Rifle Corps officers
Royal Wiltshire Yeomanry officers
Roehampton Trophy
People educated at Charterhouse School
Ulric Oliver